Chris Wardlaw (born 3 March 1950) is an Australian long-distance runner. He competed in the marathon at the 1976 Summer Olympics and the 1980 Summer Olympics.

References

1950 births
Living people
Athletes (track and field) at the 1976 Summer Olympics
Athletes (track and field) at the 1980 Summer Olympics
Australian male long-distance runners
Australian male marathon runners
Olympic athletes of Australia
Athletes from Sydney
20th-century Australian people